Gberu was an Alaafin of the Yoruba Oyo Empire. He was on the throne from 1730 to 1746.

Gberu had a close friend called Jambu, whom he made Basorun (the head of the Oyo Mesi, the principal counselors of state), however they soon turned against each other and each plotted the other man's downfall. 

After being rejected as ruler, Gberu committed suicide.

References

Alaafins of Oyo
18th-century rulers in Africa